Qiu Ziao (born 30 August 1998) is a Chinese swimmer. He competed in the men's 400 metre freestyle event at the 2016 Summer Olympics.

References

External links
 

1998 births
Living people
Olympic swimmers of China
Swimmers at the 2016 Summer Olympics
Place of birth missing (living people)
Asian Games medalists in swimming
Asian Games silver medalists for China
Swimmers at the 2018 Asian Games
Medalists at the 2018 Asian Games
Chinese male freestyle swimmers
21st-century Chinese people